Ectoedemia flavimacula is a moth of the family Nepticulidae. It is only known from the mountainous area near the Varzob River and the southern Vakhsh River valley in Tadzhikistan, near the border with Afghanistan.

The length of the forewings is 1.6-1.8 mm. Adults are on wing from June to August.

The larvae feed on Populus species, probably including Populus pruinosa. They mine the leaves of their host plant. The mine consists of a slender sinuous or even contorted gallery, which is almost completely filled with green or brownish frass. The gallery gradually widens. Pupation takes place outside of the mine.

External links
Five new mining Lepidoptera (Nepticulidae, Bucculatricidae) from Central Asia

Nepticulidae
Moths of Asia
Moths described in 1996